Arconsat is a commune in the Puy-de-Dôme department in Auvergne-Rhône-Alpes in central France. It also qualifies itself as "World home of the Saucisse de choux d'Arconsat".

Population

See also
 Communes of the Puy-de-Dôme department

References

External links

 Official site

Communes of Puy-de-Dôme